Taban is a village in Dragoman Municipality, Sofia Province, western Bulgaria. With a total population of 23, Taban spreads across 5.57 km2. It is located 40.651km away from the capital city of Sofia.

References

Villages in Sofia Province